Qalatuiyeh, also rendered as Qalatu, may refer to:
 Qalatuyeh, Fars Province
 Qalatuiyeh, Hormozgan
 Qalatuiyeh-ye Tang-e Salehi, Hormozgan Province
 Qalatuiyeh, Baft, Kerman Province
 Qalatuiyeh, Jiroft, Kerman Province